The 1989 Princeton Tigers football team was an American football team that represented Princeton University during the 1989 NCAA Division I-AA football season. Princeton tied for the Ivy League championship.

In their third year under head coach Steve Tosches, the Tigers compiled a 7–2–1 record and outscored opponents 237 to 177. Franco S. Pagnanelli was the team captain.

Princeton's 6–1 conference record tied for best in the Ivy League standings. The Tigers outscored Ivy opponents 168 to 80. The Tigers' only league loss was to their co-champion, Yale.

Princeton played its home games at Palmer Stadium on the university campus in Princeton, New Jersey.

Schedule

References

Princeton
Princeton Tigers football seasons
Ivy League football champion seasons
Princeton Tigers football